The Sand Point Site (20 BG 14) is an archaeological site located near Baraga, Michigan. It was listed on the National Register of Historic Places in 1973.

It is believed to have been occupied approximately 1100-1400 AD, and contains a diverse series of artifacts, including Juntunen style and Ramey-incised ceramics, suggesting a wide trade network. Debris at the site indicates a subsistence culture surviving on small mammals, fish, berries, and acorns.

The site was rediscovered in 1968, when a private developer began a planned lakeshore redevelopment and turned up human bones. In 1970, researchers from Western Michigan University began excavations at the site, and it was listed on the National Register of Historic Places in 1973.

References

Further reading
 
 
 
 
 

Geography of Baraga County, Michigan
Archaeological sites on the National Register of Historic Places in Michigan
Buildings and structures in Baraga County, Michigan
National Register of Historic Places in Baraga County, Michigan
Mounds in the United States
Late Woodland period
Former populated places in Michigan
Native American history of Michigan